The St. Charles Bridge near Pueblo, Colorado which brings Pueblo County Road 65 over the St. Charles River, was built in 1924.  It is a filled spandrel arch bridge.  It was listed on the National Register of Historic Places in 1985.

Salle Construction Company won competitive bidding to construct either a steel or concrete structure for its bid of $39,077. The company "used a reinforced concrete vault system to excavate for the foundations, an unusual method which they later patented." The bridge was completed during February to late June 1924.

It is one of the longest filled spandrel arch bridges in Colorado.

References

External links

Deck arch bridges in the United States
Bridges on the National Register of Historic Places in Colorado
National Register of Historic Places in Pueblo County, Colorado
Buildings and structures completed in 1924